is a Japanese kimono and  (summer kimono) designer based in Japan.

Career
 started in fashion at age 27. He uses the traditional method of hand-drawn  dyeing for his kimono. He has participated in Tokyo Fashion Week (Mercedes-Benz Fashion Week) since 2006.

 also works as an artist and interior designer, having previously creating an immense brocade piece for display in the  Edo Cultural Complex. He is a member of the Council for Fashion Designers, Tokyo. On October 20, 2020,  displayed his fashion at an event at the Victoria and Albert Museum titled The Unbounded Potential of Kimono, Kyoto to Catwalk with the Embassy of Japan in the United Kingdom.

Personal life and family
His late grandfather, and his father, were and are both kimono designers.

References

Japanese artists
Japanese fashion designers